Mouth and MacNeal was a Dutch pop duo that enjoyed commercial success in the 1970s. They are best known for their million selling recording of "How Do You Do" in 1972, which topped the Dutch chart and became a US top ten hit, also reaching number 2 in Canada, and for representing the Netherlands at the 1974 Eurovision Song Contest, finishing third with the song "I See a Star", which went on to become a UK top ten hit.

Career

They were formed in 1971 when record producer Hans van Hemert brought together the solo talent of Big Mouth (born Willem Duyn) and Maggie MacNeal (born Sjoukje van't Spijker). Big Mouth had previously sung in a number of 1960s bands, including Speedway. MacNeal had released one solo single before teaming up with Big Mouth, a cover of Marvin Gaye's "I Heard It Through the Grapevine", also produced by van Hemert.

The duo released their first single, "Hey You Love", which reached #5 in the Dutch Top 40, while the next two singles "How Do You Do" and "Hello-A" both reached #1 in the Netherlands. In 1972, "How Do You Do" reached the top of the charts throughout Continental Europe and Scandinavia and peaked at number 32 in Australia, made popular by local bands Jigsaw and Windows. "How Do You Do" was made popular in the United States by radio personality Jim Connors and the song eventually reached #8 in the U.S. in July 1972. "How Do You Do" spent 19 weeks in the Billboard Hot 100 and won the R.I.A.A. gold disc on 2 August 1972. Selling over a million copies in the U.S. alone, global sales exceeded two million.

This propelled their 1972 album Hey You Love / How Do You Do into the Billboard 200 (US #77). More hit singles followed in 1973, and in 1974 Mouth and MacNeal represented the Netherlands in the Eurovision Song Contest with their song "I See a Star", placing third to ABBA and Gigliola Cinquetti. The song became a UK top ten hit, peaking at #8.

In December 1974, shortly after their success with "I See a Star", Mouth and MacNeal split up. Big Mouth continued with Ingrid Kup (who would later become his wife) as "Big Mouth and Little Eve", whereas MacNeal resumed her solo career. MacNeal went on to represent the Netherlands again at the Eurovision Song Contest 1980 held in The Hague, singing "Amsterdam", finishing fifth in a field of nineteen.

By then, Big Mouth was also pursuing a solo career; under his own name he charted with Dutch-language versions of Frankie Miller's "Darlin" (the song was renamed "Willem") and "Chattanooga Choo Choo" (based on German singer Udo Lindenberg's adaptation). In 1992 Duyn recorded Tenpole Tudor's Wünderbar in collaboration with rock band Normaal while their own frontman Bennie Jolink recovered from a motorcycle accident.

Duyn died from a heart attack in his hometown of Roswinkel on 4 December 2004 at the age of 67.

MacNeal dropped her pseudonym and performed as Sjoukje Smit; in 2008 she reformed Mouth and MacNeal with Arie Ribbens replacing Duyn, but with no success.

On 21 March 2012 Roel Smit published the Mouth and MacNeal biography; Mouth & MacNeal, duo tegen wil en dank.

Discography

Albums
 Mouth & MacNeal (1971)
Hello and Thank You (1972)
 How Do You Do (1972) (re-release of Mouth & MacNeal) – CAN #35
 Mouth & MacNeal II (1972)
 Pocketful of Hits (1973)
Ik zee een ster (1974) (released elsewhere as I See a Star) – NL #9, NOR #20, SWE #6
 Singles (1995)
 How Do You Do (1999) (not the same as 1972 album)
 Absolutely the Best (2000)
 The Singles + (2001)

Singles

References in popular culture
Mouth and MacNeal were parodied by two members of television-satirists Farce Majeure; "How Do You Do" became a vow to steer clear from junk food, "Youkoulaleloupi" became "Chocoladeletter" and "Ik Zie Een Ster" (the original Dutch version of "I See a Star") was featured in a Eurovision Song Contest parody as "Dit Gaat Te Ver" ("This Goes Too Far").

References

External links
 Fansite with complete Dutch discography
 Official site, Maggie MacNeal

Dutch musical duos
Eurovision Song Contest entrants for the Netherlands
Eurovision Song Contest entrants of 1974
Dutch pop music groups
Male–female musical duos